Michael Keating (born 29 September 1946) is an Irish former politician.

Early life
Keating was born in Dublin in 1946. He was educated at the Christian Brothers O'Connell School, University College Dublin, and St. Patrick's College in Maynooth where he received a Bachelor of Arts. He worked as a secondary school teacher before becoming involved in politics.

Political activity
He unsuccessfully contested the 1973 general election for Fine Gael, in Dublin Central, but was elected to Dublin City Council in 1974. He became Lord Mayor of Dublin in 1983. He was successful in his second attempt at a seat in Dáil Éireann at the 1977 general election, being elected for Dublin North-Central. In 1981 he was elected in the re-created Dublin Central, and was successfully returned there at every election until retiring in 1989. He was later appointed Opposition spokesperson on urban affairs.

Minister of State
In 1981 Fine Gael came to power in a coalition government, and Keating was appointed Minister of State at the Department of Education. His portfolio was youth and sport. He remained in that position until 1982. It was the only time that he held ministerial office.

Progressive Democrats
In 1986 Keating left Fine Gael to join the newly formed Progressive Democrats and became deputy leader of the party. He won one of their 14 seats in the 1987 general election. He retired from politics in 1989 to concentrate on his business interests.

Alleged fraud
Keating paid €250,000 to the Criminal Assets Bureau for unpaid tax. The Bureau had been investigating his affairs for more than three years. He was also named in a British court in 2000 as a partner in crime, in a £20m VAT fraud.

References

1946 births
Living people
Alumni of University College Dublin
Alumni of St Patrick's College, Maynooth
People educated at O'Connell School
Fine Gael TDs
Lord Mayors of Dublin
Members of the 21st Dáil
Members of the 22nd Dáil
Members of the 23rd Dáil
Members of the 24th Dáil
Members of the 25th Dáil
Ministers of State of the 22nd Dáil
Politicians from County Dublin
Irish schoolteachers
Progressive Democrats TDs